Henry Frederick Cowper (18 April 1836 – 10 November 1887) was a British Liberal Party politician.

Cowper was the second son of George Cowper, 6th Earl Cowper, and his wife Anne (later 6th Baroness Lucas of Crudwell), daughter of Thomas de Grey, 2nd Earl de Grey. Francis Cowper, 7th Earl Cowper, was his elder brother. He entered the House of Commons as one of three representatives for Hertfordshire in 1865, a seat he held until the constituency was abolished in 1885. He fought the new seat of Hertford but was unsuccessful.

Cowper died in November 1887, aged 51.

See also
Earl Cowper

References

www.thepeerage.com

External links 
 

1836 births
1887 deaths
Liberal Party (UK) MPs for English constituencies
UK MPs 1865–1868
UK MPs 1868–1874
UK MPs 1874–1880
UK MPs 1880–1885
Henry
Younger sons of earls
Members of the Parliament of the United Kingdom for Hertfordshire